245 may refer to:

The year 245
245 (number)
"245", the name of a jazz instrumental by Eric Dolphy, featured on his 1960 album Outward Bound
245, the international country calling code for Guinea-Bissau.